Mounts Botanical Garden is a botanical garden located in West Palm Beach, Florida. It is Palm Beach County's oldest and largest public garden with over 6,000 species of tropical and subtropical plants from six continents, including plants native to Florida, exotic trees, tropical fruit, herbs, citrus and palms. Mounts Botanical is part of the Palm Beach County Cooperative Extension Department, in partnership with the University of Florida / IFAS and the nonprofit Friends of the Mounts Botanical Garden, Inc.

History 

Botanical plantings began shortly after the Mounts Building was built and opened in 1954.  Then Palm Beach County Cooperative Extension Director, Marvin Mounts, desired to create a tropical fruit tree arboretum on the adjacent three acres.  This vision was never realized, but many tropical fruits were planted and a few remain to this day.

In 1975 Clayton Hutcheson, Palm Beach County Cooperative Extension Director, had a vision of creating a Horticultural Learning Center on the three acres surrounding the Mounts Building, which housed the Extension Service. This initiative was successfully supported by many local plant-focused organizations and volunteers and was created in 1983. Today’s Garden was formed by a public-private partnership of Palm Beach County and the Friends of Mounts Horticultural Learning Center in 1985. Ten additional acres were added to the property in 1985, bringing the total acreage to fourteen. In 1986, the Friends voted to officially change the name to Mounts Botanical Garden for a more clear understanding of the organization and its mission driven purpose.

In 2004, the Friends funded a research grant to the University of Florida to produce a Master Plan to guide the Garden’s future development. During 2004 and 2005 Hurricanes Frances, Jeanne and Wilma destroyed 70% of the property’s mature tree canopy and virtually shattered the original Garden. Since 2006, The Friends and Palm Beach County have restored both the lost tree canopy and the Garden.

Windows on the Floating World – Blume Tropical Wetland Garden officially opened on  June 18, 2017.  Designed by artists Mags Harries and Lajos Héder, in collaboration with WGI’s landscape architecture division, Windows on the Floating World features open-gridded, 4-foot wide walkways on the surface of the wetlands to give visitors the feeling of “walking on water.”  Within these walks are four “windows” planted with aquatics and changed out with rotating and seasonal botanical exhibits growing from submerged containers.

The Garden of Tranquility was opened in the Spring of 2018. This serene garden experience was created by natural elements of stone, wood (bamboo) and living plant materials in an artistic Asian inspired fashion. The garden simulates a Zen-like garden although it is not meant to be authentic or of strictly Japanese elements.

Gardens 
 
 Butterfly Garden, where you will commonly find a dozen or so different species of butterflies at any given time
 Rainbow Garden, arranged in a spectrum of color hues, this full sun garden showcases a wide variety of plants that grow well in Palm Beach County
 Dry Stream Bed, allows water a cleansing path flowing through the landscape
 Edible Garden, offers a wide variety of tropical fruits, seasonal vegetables, flowers and herbs that can be successfully grown in South Florida
 Herb Garden of Well Being, showcases plants that have made our lives better though taste, cosmetics, teas, medicinal use, dyes, ceremonies and folk remedies
 Tropical Foliage Border, non-woody tropicals in two gently curving borders reliant on foliage color has a visual impact that lasts year-round
 Garden of Extremes, features plants and materials often unique to extremes such as light and weather conditions
 Rose and Fragrance Garden, pleases the eye while fragrance adds another level of indulgence
 Zimmerman Color and Shade Island, provides color in the shade through foliage, diverse texture and flowers
 Tropical Forest, lush foliage and ferns provide a feeling of a tropical forest, outdoor or living conservatory
 Tropical Cottage Garden, traditional elements include an abundance of colorful flowering perennials, annuals and vines, cascading over arbors and trellises
 Begonia Garden, highlights this popular plant which grows in the tropics along edges of forests or river banks
 Florida Native Plant Garden, comprises a Native Plant Initiative demonstrating the wide variety of plants native to South Florida in a traditional, easy to understand landscape design
 Mediterranean Garden, shows how to successfully grow Mediterranean plants or very reasonable substitutes that will thrive in the South Florida climate
 O’Keeffe Rain Garden, demonstrates how we can improve the quality of all runoff water in our region
 Trial Garden, where we evaluate plants for how well they will perform for the average gardener or landscape
 Gazebo Garden, covered in dappled shade, foliage and flower color, this is the setting for many of the weddings held in the Garden
 Garden of Tranquility, peaceful zen inspired sun garden
 Windows on the Floating World, transports visitors to a unique water garden, complete with seasonal water plants and waterfalls

Photos

See also 
 List of botanical gardens in Florida

References 

Botanical gardens in Florida
Protected areas of Palm Beach County, Florida